The 2009 LNFA season is the XV since her foundation in 1995. The Copa de España de Fútbol Americano also is held and is the second competition most important.

Regular season
 The regular season started the 24 January and finished the 10 May.
 At finish of regular season, the first two accessing directly to semifinals.
 3rd, 4th, 5th and 6th classified, plays a two-leg for accessing to semifinals.

Regular season final standings

Play-offs

2009 Copa de España

Final information

References

Liga Nacional de Fútbol Americano
2009 in American football